Klub Motorowy Cross Lublin also known as the Speed Car Motor Lublin through sponsorship rights, is a Polish motorcycle speedway team based in Lublin. The team currently competes in the Ekstraliga (the highest division) and have won the Team Speedway Polish Championship once.

History
For the Lublin speedway teams before 2017, see- 

In 2017, the speedway team in Lublin was reactivated and participated in the Polish Speedway Second League (2. liga). In the 2017 season Motor finished second in 2. liga, and reached the play-off final where they were defeated by Start Gniezno. The final was contested over two legs, one at each participating club's stadium (50:40 in Lublin, 36:53 in Gniezno). Despite losing to Start, Motor qualified for the two-game relegation-promotion playoff against the second-last place team in Nice 1. Liga – Stal Rzeszów. The first game took place on 1 October 2017 in Rzeszów, with Motor winning 52:38. Motor won the deciding game 47:25 which took place on 8 October 2017 in Lublin.

Motor Lublin ended first half of the 2018 season in first place, three points ahead of Start Gniezno. Motor finished first in the Nice 1. Liga regular season, and faced Lokomotiv Daugavpils in the play-off semi-finals. On 31 August 2018, Motor won the away leg 47:43. In the second leg, which took place on 8 September 2018 in Lublin, Motor won 55:35. In the play-off finals, Motor faced second placed side ROW Rybnik. The first leg took place on 16 September 2018 in Rybnik, which Motor lost 52:38. The return leg was contested one week later, when Motor beat ROW 53:37, and gained promotion to Ekstraliga.

In 2022, the team won the Ekstraliga and were awarded the gold medal and declared Team Speedway Polish Championship winners.

In 2023, the club signed 3-times world champion Bartosz Zmarzlik.

Teams

2023 team
 Jarosław Hampel
 Bartosz Zmarzlik
 Freddie Lindgren
 Jack Holder
 Dominik Kubera
 Mateusz Cierniak
 Bartosz Bańbor

Past teams

2022 team

 Mikkel Michelsen
 Maksym Drabik
 Jarosław Hampel
 Antti Vuolas
 Wiktor Lampart
 Mateusz Cierniak
 Dominik Kubera
 Mateusz Tudzież
 Fraser Bowes

See also
 Motor Lublin (speedway team)

References

Polish speedway teams
Sport in Lublin
Sport in Lublin Voivodeship